Luisa-Marie Neubauer (born 21 April 1996) is a German climate activist. She is one of the main organisers of the school strike for climate movement in Germany, where it is commonly referred to under its alternative name Fridays for Future. She advocates a climate policy that complies with and surpasses the Paris Agreement and endorses de-growth. Neubauer is a member of Alliance 90/The Greens and the Green Youth.

Life
Neubauer was born in Hamburg as the youngest of four siblings. Her mother is a nurse. Her grandmother was married for some years to Feiko Reemtsma of the Reemtsma cigarette empire and got involved in the anti-nuclear movement of the 1980s. She sensitized Luisa Neubauer to the climate problem and gave her her share of the taz cooperative. Two of Neubauer's three older siblings live in London. Her cousin Carla Reemtsma is also a climate activist.

Neubauer grew up in Hamburg's Iserbrook district and completed her high school diploma in 2014 at the Marion-Dönhoff-Gymnasium in the affluent Blankenese neighborhood. In the year after her graduation she worked for a development aid project in Tanzania and on an organic farm in England. In 2015 she started studying geography at the University of Göttingen. She did a semester abroad at the University College London and received scholarships from the German government and the Alliance 90/The Greens-affiliated Heinrich Böll Foundation. In 2020 she completed her studies with a Bachelor of Science.

Early activism
Neubauer has been a youth ambassador of the non-governmental organization ONE since 2016. She was also active for the Foundation for the Rights of Future Generations, 350.org, the Right Livelihood Award foundation, the Fossil Free campaign and The Hunger Project. With the campaign Divest! Withdraw your money! she forced the University of Göttingen to stop investing in industries that make money with coal, oil or gas.

Fridays For Future
As of the beginning of 2019, Neubauer became known as one of the leading Fridays For Future activists. Many media outlets refer to her as the "German face of the movement." Neubauer rejects comparisons of herself and other strike organisers to Greta Thunberg, saying: "We're building a mass-movement and reaching out quite far in our methods of mobilizing and gaining attention. What Greta does is incredibly inspiring but actually relatively far from that."

Neubauer does not see the strikes as a means of directly affecting politics. More important is the work behind the strikes: "What we're doing is incredibly sustainable. We're creating structures and turning the events into educational experiences. And we're leading debates on the principles of climate protection."

Following the protests of Fridays For Future Germany against Siemens for a specific infrastructure project in Australia, Neubauer met with Joe Kaeser in January 2020. On 13 January 2020 she announced that she had turned down an offer for a seat on the Siemens Energy's supervisory board: "If I were to take it up, I would be obliged to represent the company's interests and could never be an independent critic of Siemens," Neubauer explained. "That is not compatible with my role as [a] climate activist.". Joe Kaeser stated that he did not offer Neubauer a seat in the companies' Board, but that he is open to have Neubauer on a Board on environmental questions 

On the day before Siemens announced that they will keep the contract with Adani to provide the rail infrastructure of the Carmichael coal mine in Australia. Neubauer told the news agency DPA: "We asked Kaeser to do everything possible to stop the Adani mine. Instead he will now profit from this disastrous project." She added that this decision was "so last century" and that Kaeser was making an "unforgivable mistake".

Position and appearances

Relationship to politics

Although Neubauer is a member of Alliance 90/The Greens and the Green Youth, she says she does not actively pursue party work.  
At Alliance 90/The Greens policy convention on March 29, 2019, Neubauer gave a speech that was received with much applause. She called for an emissions budget for Germany. "If even the Greens can't do that, then I don't know why we're even taking to the streets", Neubauer said.

Neubauer assessed the 2019 European elections as a key event to motivate the European youth to protect climate. According to her, the Grand Coalition failed after the climate strikes began. They were postponing the adoption of a climate protection law and were celebrating a coal phase-out that is ten years too late for the climate.

At the EU summit in Sibiu in May 2019, Neubauer joined other climate activists in meeting Emmanuel Macron and eight other EU leaders.

In an interview with Tagesthemen (one of Germany's main daily television news magazines) on August 20, 2020, after a meeting with other activists and German Chancellor Angela Merkel, Luisa Neubauer expressed skepticism about the German government's activities to achieve the climate target of 1.5 degrees global warming. "Who, if not Germany, could lead the way here?" She also expressed irritation about the commissioning of new coal-fired power plants.

During the Spiegel interview with member of German parliament Wolfgang Schäuble at the end of October 2020, Neubauer emphasized the special status of the climate crisis as a problem that affects all areas of life. A stable democracy and a good economy require a stable planet. Ultimately, he said, it was "about us humans" for whom the climate crisis would eventually become unbearable. Measured by the Paris climate goals and scientific findings, action is clearly too slow. The price for this is an escalating climate crisis. "And nothing will rob us of more freedom than this crisis. The slower we are, the greater the destruction, the greater the restriction of freedom in the end."

In a double interview in September 2021 with Tagesspiegel (a German daily newspaper), which interviewed her along with Greta Thunberg, Neubauer criticized the media and politicians for downplaying or ignoring the climate crisis for decades. Chancellor Angela Merkel never once "went out on a limb" for climate change, never took a serious risk "to move the country noticeably toward climate-friendly democracy." As a result, it remains unclear how the public would respond on the question of how just a form of climate protection is, in which there is no real social compensation for rising costs for housing heating and fuel for internal combustion cars due to increased CO2 prices, Neubauer said that Fridays for Future is a movement for climate justice. It also demands socially just climate protection. She said it's important to be vigilant in this debate: "We experience political voices that never supported climate action now using social inequality as an excuse to do nothing."

Criticism
Neubauer received negative press coverage for her past flights to countries all around the world. She responded that any criticism of her personal consumption distracts from larger structural and political issues.

, a professor of political science at the University of Regensburg, accused her of using the term "old white men" as a synonym for people with different opinions to discredit people with different opinions.

References

External links
 published 4 October 2019 TED (conference)

1996 births
Living people
People from Altona, Hamburg
Alliance 90/The Greens politicians
21st-century German women politicians
Politicians from Hamburg
Climate activists
Youth climate activists
German environmentalists
German women environmentalists
University of Göttingen alumni